is artificial island in Hakata Bay, Fukuoka, Japan. Island Tower Sky Club and Teriha Sekisui House Arena are on this island.

References

Geography of Fukuoka
Artificial islands of Japan
Islands of Fukuoka Prefecture
Redeveloped ports and waterfronts in Japan